Enixotrophon condei is a species of sea snail, a marine gastropod mollusc in the family Muricidae, the murex snails or rock snails.

Description

Distribution

References

 Marshall B.A. & Houart R. (2011) The genus Pagodula (Mollusca: Gastropoda: Muricidae) in Australia, the New Zealand region and the Tasman Sea. New Zealand Journal of Geology and Geophysics 54(1): 89–114. [Published March 2011] page(s): 114

External links
 Houart, R. (2003). Description of three new species of Trophon s.l. Montfort, 1810 (Gastropoda: Muricidae) from Chile. Novapex. 4 (4): 101-110

Gastropods described in 2003
Enixotrophon